Colyttus is a genus of Asian jumping spiders that was first described by Tamerlan Thorell in 1891. C. lehtinen is named in honor of Finnish arachnologist Pekka T. Lehtinen.

Species
 it contains seven species, found only in Asia:
Colyttus bilineatus Thorell, 1891 (type) – Indonesia (Sumatra, Moluccas)
Colyttus kerinci (Prószyński & Deeleman-Reinhold, 2012) – Indonesia (Sumatra)
Colyttus lehtineni Zabka, 1985 – China, Vietnam
Colyttus nigriceps (Simon, 1899) – Indonesia (Sumatra)
Colyttus proszynskii Caleb, Chatterjee, Tyagi, Kundu & Kumar, 2018 – India
Colyttus robustus Zhang & Maddison, 2012 – Malaysia
Colyttus striatus (Simon, 1902) – Borneo

References

Salticidae
Salticidae genera
Spiders of Asia
Taxa named by Tamerlan Thorell